John Douglas Horler (born 26 February 1947) is an English jazz pianist. He is the younger brother of jazz musician David Horler and the uncle of Natalie Horler, lead singer in the band Cascada.

Horler was born in Lymington. He began on piano at age six, and learned jazz from his father, a trumpeter. He studied at the Royal Academy of Music (1963–67), then played with the big bands of Bobby Lamb, Ray Premru, BBC Radio, Dave Hancock, and Maynard Ferguson. He worked with Tommy Whittle for much of the 1970s, Tony Coe later in the decade, Ronnie Ross for several years in the 1980s, Peter King in the late 1980s and early 1990s, and Jimmy Hastings around the same time as King. He led small groups intermittently and accompanied John Dankworth and Kenny Wheeler on record.

References
Mark Gilbert, "John Horler". Grove Jazz online.

Further reading
John Chilton, Who's Who of British Jazz.

External links
 

Living people
1947 births
British jazz pianists
Alumni of the Royal Academy of Music
21st-century pianists